Bridgend is a 2015 English-language Danish drama film directed by Jeppe Rønde and written by Rønde alongside Torben Bech and Peter Asmussen. The film is based on the Bridgend suicide incidents. The film had its World Premiere at the International Film Festival Rotterdam and its North American premiere at the Tribeca Film Festival, at both of which it was highly acclaimed; in the latter, it received three awards, including Best Actress for Hannah Murray. The general reviews have been mixed to positive, with Metacritic giving an average score of 53 out of 100 points, counting nine reviews. The film was viewed in Wales however as sensationalist, lacking truth and exploitative of the dead teenagers.

Cast
 Hannah Murray as Sara
 Steven Waddington as Dave
 Josh O'Connor as Jamie
 Adrian Rawlins as Vicar
 Patricia Potter as Rachel
 Aled Thomas as Danny
 Elinor Crawley as Laurel
Scott Arthur as Thomas 
 Jamie Burch as Angus
 Corey Brown as Extra

Awards and nominations

References

External links

2015 drama films
2015 films
English-language Welsh films
English-language Danish films
British drama films
Danish drama films
Films set in Wales
2010s English-language films
2010s British films